{{DISPLAYTITLE:C26H38O2}}
The molecular formula C26H38O2 may refer to:

 AM-855, an analgesic drug 
 Mecigestone, a steroidal progestin
 Quingestrone, also known as progesterone 3-cyclopentyl enol ether (PCPE)